Menominee (YT‑807) is a United States Navy . The tugboat is named for the people of the Menominee tribe.

Construction

The contract for Menominee was awarded 8 October 2010. She was laid down 1 March 2011 by J.M. Martinac Shipbuilding Corp., Tacoma, Washington and launched 3 December 2011.

Operational history

Menominee was delivered to the Navy at Yokosuka and is assigned to Commander Fleet Activities Yokosuka.

References

 
 

 

 

Valiant-class tugboats
Ships built in Tacoma, Washington
2012 ships